Fablo dos Santos Oliveira (born 15 February 1999), also known simply as Fablo, is a Brazilian professional footballer who plays as a forward for Barra da Tijuca.

Club career
Born in Rio de Janeiro, Fablo began his career with Barra da Tijuca, making his debut for the team on 16 June 2019 in a 2–0 defeat to Campos in the 2019 Campeonato Carioca Série B1 state championship.

In March 2020, Fablo joined American USL League One side Orlando City B on loan for the 2020 season. He made his debut for Orlando City B on 14 August 2020 as a 58th minute substitute for José Quintero during a 1–1 draw with Fort Lauderdale.

Career statistics

Club

References

External links
Fablo at Orlando City

1999 births
Living people
Footballers from Rio de Janeiro (city)
Brazilian footballers
Association football forwards
Orlando City B players
USL League One players
Brazilian expatriate footballers
Expatriate soccer players in the United States